Sterna milne-edwardsii is an extinct tern from the  Miocene. It was named after Alphonse Milne-Edwards a French ornithologist specialising in fossil birds.

References

milne-edwardsii
Fossil taxa described in 1931
Miocene birds
Birds described in 1931